Izydor Modelski (born May 10, 1889, in L'viv, and died on September 25, 1962 in Washington DC) was a Polish spy and a lieutenant general of the Polish Army. Modelski also completed a doctorate in philosophy at the University of Lviv in 1917. In 1946, he was sent to the United States to establish a spy ring. Defying an order to return to Poland in 1948, he testified about his actions to the House Un-American Activities Committee in 1949.

General Modelski is interred at Mount Olivet Cemetery in Washington, D.C.

See also
 Władysław Sikorski
 Stanisław Mikołajczyk
 Polish government-in-exile
 Sadyba

References

External links

1889 births
1962 deaths
Polish generals
Military personnel from Lviv
Polish defectors
Polish spies
Polish People's Army personnel
American spies
Cold War spies
Defectors to the United States
Polish military personnel of World War II
Polish prisoners of war
World War II prisoners of war held by the Soviet Union
Recipients of the Silver Cross of the Virtuti Militari
Recipients of the Cross of Valour (Poland)
Polish emigrants to the United States
Burials at Mount Olivet Cemetery (Washington, D.C.)
Polish military attachés